Laurie Zeluck Carter (October 12, 1957 – February 9, 2006) was an American pianist and electronic musician who recorded under the name Laurie Z.  Her music is described as a blend of classical, jazz and contemporary instrumental.

Discography
Laurie Z. CD titles include:
Window to the World
Life Between The Lines
Roots, The Solo Piano Album
Heart of the Holidays
The Heart’s Journey
Heart of the Holidays - Bonus Music CD included with Sheryl Roush's book Heart of the Holidays

For Yamaha Disklavier:
Roots, The Solo Piano Album

Printed Songbook (also in PDF format):
Roots, The Solo Piano Songbook

List of solo piano pieces
Stranger in a Familiar Land
Roots
Michael’s Song
The Still of the Night
In the Monterey Mist
Invisibility
For the Love of a Child
Too Blue
The Mysterious Painter
The River
From the Ashes
Kelly's Garden
Dream Come True
Good Night, My Friend
My Perfect Love
Sunrise
Heart of the Holidays
Warmth From Within
Common Ground
Who Knew
Cheyenne
Portrait
ParaSailing (Unreleased)
Lost & Found (Unreleased)
Surfer Steve 
With A Twinkle In Her Eye 
Lullaby for Matthew

Career and recognition
Laurie Z. toured extensively and opened for instrumentalists like Herbie Hancock, Leo Kottke and Tim Weisburg and she performed at major clubs Troubadour and Roxy.  Laurie Z. also played national tours for Alesis and Yamaha and represented Roland and Kawai products.  She regularly performed and demonstrated products at NAMM, CES, COMDEX and Atari conventions and in 2007 was honored in NAMM's annual tribute.

Laurie Z. concerts were frequently mentioned as a ‘Top Pick’ in the Los Angeles Times.  She could be heard performing regularly at Nordstrom, South Bay Galleria, playing solo piano at the Manhattan Country Club in Manhattan Beach and performing around the South Bay as bandleader for the "Z Three Trio" and "Laurie Z. Band." From 1989 to 1994 Laurie played Disneyland's Tomorrowland Terrace in the rock group "Voyager", and was the featured keyboardist at the Anaheim Pond for the Mighty Ducks professional hockey team's inaugural season.  Beginning in 1991, Laurie Z. became the featured pianist for Peterbilt Motors at the International Trucking Show, performing for Peterbilt for over a decade.  Her television music appearances included Fame, the Disney Cable Network and DirecTV's "InTune."

During the 80s, before going solo, Laurie recorded for Malcolm Cecil – inventor of the unique TONTO synthesizer – who had a company, EMPH Inc., "Electronic Music Publishing House." EMPH, Inc. released the very first MIDI recording and playback software (MIDIPLAY) for the now obsolete Atari 1040 computer. Laurie recorded MIDI versions of songs for that program which were sold as "Musidiscs." Only three Musidiscs were ever released - Beatles songs, Christmas music and some Grammy winning songs from 1986, and Laurie Z. recorded on all of them.

Launching her own Independent record label, Zebra Productions, Laurie Z. produced her first album Window To The World.  Her second release Life Between The Lines was named "New Age Album of the Year" by Scott Brodie of CHRW-FM, Canada. Roots, The Solo Piano Album was recorded live on the Yamaha Disclavier Acoustic Piano and was considered for eight Grammy nominations.  Heart of the Holidays included special guest, actor Jack Palance, narrating 'The Night Before Christmas.' The Heart’s Journey, a relaxation program presented by hypnotherapist Ron Stubbs, with music composed and performed by Laurie Z., was considered for seven Grammy nominations.

External links
Laurie Z.'s Official Website
Santa Barbara Independent Newspaper Article
TAXI Profile
Laurie Z. Concert Videos

1957 births
2006 deaths
American women composers
20th-century American keyboardists
New-age pianists
American women in electronic music
20th-century American women pianists
20th-century American pianists
20th-century American composers
People from Queens, New York
People from Camano, Washington
20th-century women composers
Deaths from lung cancer in California
21st-century American women pianists
21st-century American pianists